Hope Sandrow (born 1951) is an American multi-disciplinary artist.

Early life and education

Sandrow was born in Philadelphia, Pennsylvania. She took up drawing at a young age, and eventually attended the Philadelphia College of Art, graduating in 1975.

Career

Sandrow exhibited at the Museum of Modern Art, New York in 1984. In the mid 1980s, she founded the Artist & Homeless Collaborative project. Through it, artists such as Kiki Smith, Robert Kushner, the Guerilla Girls and Ida Applebroog worked on creative projects with women in local homeless shelters. Sandrow's career was interrupted in 1994 by a dental injury that led to a six-year-long chronic infection and a multi-year period of recovery after the cause of the infection was identified and corrected. The Artist & Homeless Collaborative shut down in 1995.

In 2006, after adopting a Paduan rooster she had encountered in the woods, Sandrow began to create art based on raising poultry, including live video of brooding hens, original and commissioned portraits of chickens, and occasional deliveries of eggs from her own chickens to people in the art world. In 2021, some of her artistic and documentary work was included in a New York Historical Society exhibit looking back on the Artist & Homeless Collaborative. Her work is also included in the collections of the Whitney Museum of American Art and the Metropolitan Museum of Art.

Personal life

As of 2021, Sandrow lives in Shinnecock Hills, New York with her husband, the artist and composer Ulf Skogsbergh.

References

1951 births
20th-century American artists
20th-century American women artists
21st-century American artists
21st-century American women artists
Living people